Pleroma asperius is a species of flowering plant in the family Melastomataceae, native to Brazil. It was first described by Adelbert von Chamisso in 1834 as Lasiandra asperior. One of its synonyms is Tibouchina asperior.

References

asperius
Flora of Brazil
Plants described in 1834